Persicula pulcherrima is a species of sea snail, a marine gastropod mollusk, in the family Cystiscidae.

Distribution
This species occurs in Aruba, Belize, Bonaire, Caribbean Sea, Colombia, Cuba, Curaçao, Lesser Antilles, Puerto Rico and San Andrés

References

pulcherrima
Gastropods described in 1849
Cystiscidae